The Bross Hotel, at 312 Onarga Avenue in Paonia, Colorado, was listed on the National Register of Historic Places in 2015.

It is a two-and-one-half-story brick building with a two-story front porch, and is Late Victorian in style.  It has a gambrel roof.

References

Hotels in Colorado
National Register of Historic Places in Delta County, Colorado
Victorian architecture in Colorado